In baseball, an extra base hit (EB, EBH or XBH), also known as a long hit, is any base hit on which the batter is able to advance past first base without the benefit of a fielder either committing an error or opting to make a throw to retire another base runner (see fielder's choice). Extra base hits are often not listed separately in tables of baseball statistics, but are easily determined by calculating the sum total of a batter's doubles, triples, and home runs.

Hank Aaron is the all-time leader with 1,477 career extra base hits. Barry Bonds (1,440) and Albert Pujols (1,401) are the other players with more than 1,400 career extra base hits. Only 39 players all-time have reached 1,000 career extra base hits, with 2 of them (Albert Pujols and Miguel Cabrera) being active.

Key

List

Stats updated as of the end of the 2022 season.

Notes

References

External links

Major League Baseball statistics
Extra base hits leaders